UGK 4 Life is the sixth and final studio album by American hip hop duo UGK. The album was released on March 31, 2009, by Jive Records. This is also the first posthumous album for Pimp C.

Background
On December 4, 2007, Pimp C was found dead in his California hotel room. In March 2008, Bun B confirmed the final studio album would be dedicated to the late Pimp C.

Recording
The first single "Da Game Been Good to Me" was released onto the Internet on January 16, 2009. It was made available on iTunes on February 20, 2009. Bun B stated he recorded a song dedicated to his late partner Pimp C.

Bun B stated that he would not experiment with new collaborations or producers.

In addition to Pimp C, production came from producers such as Mannie Fresh, Akon, Cory Mo, Steve Below and DJ B-Do. Collaborators include Ronald Isley, Lil Boosie, Webbie, Killa Kyleon, Slim Thug, Too Short, Snoop Dogg, Sleepy Brown, Big Gipp, Akon & Raheem DeVaughn.

Reception

Upon release, UGK 4 Life received critical acclaim. At Metacritic, which assigns a normalized rating out of 100 to reviews from mainstream critics, the album has received a score of 84, based on 11 reviews indicating universal acclaim.

Commercial performance
The album debuted at number 6 on the Billboard 200 selling 76,419 copies in its first week.

Track listing

 (co.) denotes co-producer.

Sample credits
 "Still on the Grind" contains samples of "Don't Mess With Mr. T" by Marvin Gaye.
 "Everybody Wanna Ball" contains samples of "Big Pimpin'" by Jay-Z and UGK.
 "Feelin' You" contains samples of "Feel That You're Feelin'" by Maze.
 "The Pimp & The Bun" contains samples of "Here We Go Again" by The Isley Brothers.
 "Swishas & Erb" contains samples of "Peaches & Erb" by Society of Soul.
 "Purse Come First" contains samples of "Try Love Again" by The Natural Four.
 "Harry Asshole" contains samples of "I Left It Wet For You" by UGK and alludes lyrics from "Let Me See It" by UGK.

Personnel
Adapted from AllMusic.

 Ruben Bailey: Composer
 Keith Bardin: Photography
 Steve Below: Composer, Producer
 Frankie Beverly: Composer	
 Leslie Brathwaite: Mixing
 Calvin Broadus: Composer
 Patrick Brown	: Composer
 Bun B: Executive Producer
 Chad Butler: Composer
 Mike Dean: Mixing, Producer
 Hal Fitzgerald: Engineer
 Pam Francis: Photography
 Mannie Fresh: Producer
 Jeff Gilligan: Art Direction, Design
 Cameron K-Oz Gipp: Composer
 Michael Hawkins: Composer
 Lee Hutson, Jr.: Composer
 Ernie Isley: Composer
 Marvin Isley: Composer
 O'Kelly Isley: Composer

 Ronald Isley: Composer
 Rudolph Isley: Composer
 Chris Jasper: Composer
 Anzel "Intl Red" Jennings: A&R
 Brandt Jones: Composer
 Rick Marcel: Guitar
 Clay Patrick McBride: Photography
 Mike Mo: Engineer, Mixing
 Corey Moore: Composer
 Raymond "Yoda" Murray: Composer
 J. Prince: Executive Producer
 Ari Raskin: Engineer
 Todd Shaw: Composer
 Jeffrey Sledge: A&R
 Premro Smith: Composer
 Chris Soper: Engineer
 Earl Stevens: Composer
 Aliaune "Akon" Thiam: Composer
 Giorgio Tuinfort: Composer, Producer
 Rico Wade: Composer

Charts

Weekly charts

Year-end charts

References

Jive Records albums
UGK albums
Albums produced by Akon
Albums produced by Mannie Fresh
Albums produced by Mike Dean (record producer)
2009 albums
Albums published posthumously